This is a partial list of lawsuits involving Tesla, Inc, the American automotive and energy company, since 2008; as of December 2021, Tesla is party to over 1,200 lawsuits, and as of September 2021, it is party to 200 in China alone. A significant amount of the cases notably derive from the actions of the company's CEO, Elon Musk, who is also party to many of his own lawsuits. TSLAQ, a loose collective of anonymous short-sellers and skeptics of Tesla and Elon Musk, regularly discusses and shares news of these lawsuits on Twitter and elsewhere.

On-going

Securities litigation related to Musk "funding secured" tweet 

A class-action lawsuit from August and September 2018 regarding Musk's tweets about potentially going private (In re Tesla Inc. Securities Litigation) ended in February 2023 when a jury found Musk and Tesla not liable. In October and November 2018, five derivative lawsuits were filed in the Delaware Court of Chancery against Musk and the members of Tesla's board of directors (as then constituted) in relation to statements and actions connected to the potential going private transaction.  These lawsuits were stayed pending resolution of the class-action lawsuit. 

A lawsuit filed in March 2021 alleges that Musk violated his fiduciary duty to Tesla by continuing to send "erratic" tweets in violation of the SEC settlement, and that the board is failing to control Musk. The case was also stayed pending resolution of the class-action lawsuit.

Litigation relating to 2018 CEO performance award 
In June 2018, a Tesla stockholder filed a putative class and derivative action in the Delaware Court of Chancery against Musk and the members of Tesla's board of directors alleging they breached their fiduciary duties by approving Musk's unusually high stock-based compensation plan. The complaint seeks monetary damages and a restructuring of the CEO's stock-based compensation plan. The trial took place in November 2022 and is awaiting a verdict.

Litigation related to Directors' compensation 
On June 17, 2020, a Detroit pension fund filed a derivative action against the Tesla board members. The lawsuit claims the board members have consistently awarded themselves unfair and excessive compensation from 2017 to 2020. Trial is set for September 2023.

Whistleblower allegations and retaliation 
In 2019, Lynn Thompson sued Tesla for terminating his security contract after he reported the theft of US$37 million worth of copper and other raw materials to local authorities. In 2020, the case was stayed pending arbitration.

In November 2020, former Tesla employee Steven Henkes filed a lawsuit alleging he was fired by Tesla in retaliation for raising safety concerns about "unacceptable fire risks" in the company's solar installations. Tesla solar installations have caught fire at seven Walmart locations, as well as an Amazon warehouse. The SEC confirmed in September 2021 that it has an active and ongoing investigation related to the whistleblower complaint Henkes made in 2019. , the lawsuit is unresolved.

Agreement misrepresented as loan 
A Tesla Solar customer alleged in a 2020 filing that the company engaged in "bait-and-switch financing" for reporting his solar-financing agreement as "a massive loan" to credit agencies, therefore upending the customer's credit rating. In April 2021, the case was ordered to arbitration. , the case was still in arbitration.

Bios Group lawsuit 
In December 2020, Dutch taxi service Bios Group filed for over 1.3 million EU in damages against Tesla, citing defects including broken power steering and odometers.

Full-Self Driving claim 
In August 2021, a Tesla owner filed a complaint that Tesla "fraudulently concealed its engineering failures" in regards to its beta Full Self-Driving software and falsely represented the capabilities of the product. , the case is unresolved.

Texas police complaint 
In September 2021, five police officers submitted a complaint against in part Tesla for a crash involving Autopilot that left them badly injured. The plaintiffs' stated aim is to "force Tesla to publicly acknowledge and immediately correct the known defects inherent in its Autopilot [capability]".

Sexual harassment at Fremont facility cases 
In December 2021, six women working at the Fremont factory and service center filed sexual harassment lawsuits against the company.

Fair Employment and Housing racism suit 
In February 2022, the California Department of Fair Employment and Housing (DFEH) sued Tesla for "discriminating against its Black workers" after it "received hundreds of complaints from Tesla workers." and "found evidence that Tesla's Fremont factory is a racially segregated workplace where Black workers are subjected to racial slurs and discriminated against in job assignments, discipline, pay and promotion creating a hostile work environment". One Black worker complained of hearing racial slurs as often as 50 to 100 times per day. In a February 2022 blog post, Tesla responded to the lawsuit and stated that they "will be asking the court to pause the case and take other steps to ensure that facts and evidence will be heard."

In August 2022, California's Office of Administrative Law declined to review a petition from Tesla claiming that DFEH failed to conduct a full investigation prior to filing the lawsuit.

Autopilot fatality suits 

, litigation is ongoing in three cases involving the use of Tesla Autopilot during a fatal incident: the cases of Walter Huang, Jeremy Banner, and Jenna Monet.

Individual racism lawsuits 
, litigation is ongoing related to Kaylen Barker and Marc Cage who both alleged racial-based harassment from their Tesla factory coworkers.

"Whompy wheels" lawsuit 
In February 2022, a lawsuit was filed against Tesla regarding a fatality involving suspension breakage (so-called "whompy wheels"). The lawsuit follows a Tesla recall in China due to breakages of front and rear suspension linkages and ball joints, noting that the same components are used in all models of Tesla's that have been sold in North America and around the world. Tesla had recently claimed in a letter to the NHTSA that "the root cause of the issue is driver abuse...uniquely severe in the China market."

Sudden unintended braking class action 
In August 2022, a consumer class action was filed alleging that the Autopilot system in Tesla cars "contains a hazardous defect which causes the vehicle to suddenly and unintentionally brake," a phenomenon dubbed phantom braking.

Dogecoin racketeering lawsuit 
In June 2022, Musk, Tesla, and other companies lead by him were listed as defendants in a class action lawsuit claiming they participated in a pyramid scheme around the price of Dogecoin. Damages were listed at $258 billion.

Deceptive Autopilot and Full Self-Driving advertising 
In September 2022, a proposed class action federal lawsuit was filed against Tesla for allegedly misleading customers "who since 2016 bought or leased Tesla vehicles with Autopilot, Enhanced Autopilot and Full Self-Driving features." Over 300,000 vehicles were recalled due to being unsafe around intersections.

Resolved

Fisker Automotive 
On April 14, 2008, Tesla sued Fisker Automotive, alleging that Henrik Fisker "stole design ideas and confidential information related to the design of hybrid and electric cars" and was using that information to develop the Fisker Karma. Tesla had hired Fisker Coachbuild to design the WhiteStar sedan, but rejected the design that Musk considered "substandard". On November 3, 2008, Fisker Automotive Inc. issued a press release indicating that an arbitrator had issued an interim award finding in Fisker's favor on all claims.

Top Gear review 
Tesla unsuccessfully sued British television show Top Gear for its 2008 review of the Tesla Roadster (2008) in which Jeremy Clarkson could be seen driving one around the Top Gear test track, complaining about a range of only , before showing workers pushing it into the garage, supposedly out of charge. Tesla filed a lawsuit against the BBC for libel and malicious falsehood, claiming that two cars were provided and that at any point, at least one was ready to drive. Paradoxically, the range of 55 mi was calculated by Tesla itself and supplied to Top Gear as an estimate of the car's range. In addition, Tesla said that neither car ever dropped below 25% charge, and that the scene was staged. However, Top Gear frequently stages scenes for comedic effect, for example by showing Jeremy Clarkson having to refuel the Jaguar XJS three times during the review of it. The High Court in London rejected Tesla's libel claim. The falsehood claims were later struck out.

Founder dispute 
The company founding was the subject of a lawsuit that was later dropped after an out-of-court settlement. On May 26, 2009, Eberhard filed suit against Tesla and Musk for slander, libel and breach of contract. Musk wrote a lengthy blog post that included original source documents, including emails between senior executives and other artifacts attempting to demonstrate that Eberhard was fired by Tesla's unanimous board of directors. A judge struck down Eberhard's claim that he was one of only two company founders. Tesla said in a statement that the ruling is "consistent with Tesla's belief in a team of founders, including the company's current CEO and Product Architect Elon Musk, and Chief Technology Officer JB Straubel, who were both fundamental to the creation of Tesla from inception." Eberhard withdrew the case and the parties reached a final settlement. One public provision said that the parties will consider Eberhard, Musk, Straubel, Tarpenning and Wright to be the five co-founders. Eberhard issued a statement about Musk's foundational role in the company: "As a co-founder of the company, Elon's contributions to Tesla have been extraordinary."

Ecotricity agreement 
In early 2014, Tesla reportedly tried to break the exclusivity agreement their charging partner in the UK had for locations along the UK's highways and tried to "blacken Ecotricity's name with politicians and the media". Ecotricity replied by taking an injunction against them. The dispute was resolved out of court.

Securities litigation relating to SolarCity's financial statements and guidance 
On March 28, 2014, a purported stockholder class action was filed in the U.S. District Court for the Northern District of California against SolarCity and two of its officers. The complaint alleges violations of federal securities laws and seeks unspecified compensatory damages and other relief on behalf of a purported class of purchasers of SolarCity's securities from March 6, 2013, to March 18, 2014. On March 8, 2018, the Court upheld the District Court ruling of dismissal and judgment in Tesla's favor. The case is concluded.

Tesla was also party to a lawsuit filed in July 2018, alleging that SolarCity improperly fired three employees who blew the whistle on fraudulent sales records at the company. On June 5, 2020, the lawsuit was dismissed with prejudice.

Illegal workers suit 
The Mercury News in 2016 investigated the use of foreign construction workers to build Tesla's paint shop at Tesla Factory. A whistleblower federal lawsuit was filed, which was unsealed in the summer of 2017. The suit alleged that Tesla and other major automakers such as Mercedes-Benz, BMW and Volkswagen, illegally used foreign construction workers to build their U.S. factories. Court documents and the journalistic investigation showed that at least 140 foreign workers worked on the factory expansion, some of whom had questionable work visas, for as little as five dollars per hour. The workers came mainly from Eastern Europe on "suspect visas hired through subcontractors."

On March 20, 2019, a decision by the United States District Court in San Jose dismissed most claims.

Singapore tax surcharge 
In early March 2016, a report by Stuff magazine said that test performed by VICOM, Ltd on behalf of Singapore's Land Transport Authority had found a 2014 Tesla Model S to be consuming , which was greater than the  reported by the U.S. Environmental Protection Agency (EPA) and the  reported by Tesla.

Later that month, the Land Transport Authority released a statement stating that they and the VICOM Emission Test Laboratory will be working with Tesla engineers to review the test, and a Tesla statement indicated that the discussions were "positive" and that they were confident of a quick resolution.

, consumers can order a new Tesla to be imported into Singapore, for delivery in mid-2021, with no mention of a surcharge. , Teslas sold in Singapore increased ten-fold to 487 in the third quarter, compared to just 50 in the first half of 2021.

Workplace harassment 
One female engineer at Tesla filed a lawsuit in 2016 describing a culture of "pervasive harassment". The lawsuit was dismissed with prejudice in 2019.

Corporate litigation relating to the SolarCity acquisition 
Between September 1, 2016, and October 5, 2016, seven lawsuits were filed in the Court of Chancery of the State of Delaware challenging Tesla's acquisition of SolarCity. In October 2016, the Court consolidated the actions and appointed a lead plaintiff. The plaintiffs alleged, among other things, that the Tesla board of directors as then constituted breached their fiduciary duties in approving the acquisition and that certain individuals would be unjustly enriched by the acquisition. The complaint asserts both derivative claims and direct claims on behalf of a purported class and seeks, among other relief, $13 billion from Elon Musk.

The acquisition was approved by Tesla and SolarCity's stockholders on November 17, 2016 and the merger closed on November 21, 2016. On October 24, 2019, the transcripts of video depositions of Elon Musk and other SolarCity board members became widely available. The trial was held in July 2021. On October 22, 2021, the lawsuit was limited to a derivative lawsuit and the direct claims against Musk were dismissed. The court ruled in Musk's favor in April 2022, but an appeal has been entered.

SEC investigations in 2016 regarding GAAP reporting 
An SEC investigation in October 2016 about Tesla's use of non-GAAP (Generally Accepted Accounting Principles) reporting closed "without further action"; Tesla switched to GAAP-reporting in October 2016.

Autopilot 2 class-action lawsuit 
On April 19, 2017, Tesla owners filed a class-action lawsuit due to Tesla exaggerating the capabilities of its Autopilot 2 to consumers. The lawsuit claimed that "buyers of the affected vehicles have become beta testers of half-baked software that renders Tesla vehicles dangerous if engaged". Tesla attacked the lawsuit as a "disingenuous attempt to secure attorney's fees posing as a legitimate legal action".

On May 19, 2018, Tesla reached an agreement to settle the class-action lawsuit. Under the agreement, class members, who paid to get the Autopilot upgrade between 2016 and 2017, will receive between US$20 and $280 in compensation. Tesla has agreed to place more than $5 million into a settlement fund, which will also cover attorney fees. The proposed settlement does not mention the safety allegations but focuses on the delay in making the promised features available to consumers. The agreement was approved in November 2018.

Union busting attempts 
On April 19, 2017, Tesla factory workers filed unfair labor practice charges with the National Labor Relations Board, alleging that Tesla uses "illegal surveillance, coercion, intimidation and prevention of worker communications [...] in an effort to prevent or otherwise hinder unionization of the Fremont factory."

According to CNBC, "the United Automobile Workers (UAW) union filed four separate charges with the National Labor Relations Board alleging that [Tesla] has illegally surveilled and coerced workers attempting to distribute information about the union drive." On February 10, 2017, three Tesla employees allegedly were passing out literature to initiate organizing union efforts. The literature pointed to working conditions, the company's confidentiality agreement and employee rights under the National Labor Relations Act. The UAW's charges allege that Tesla illegally told employees that they could not pass out any literature unless it was approved by the company.

The Fremont plant has been unionized in the past, both when owned by General Motors (GM), and later by the NUMMI partnership of GM and Toyota. While under UAW oversight, the plant closed once in 1982 (GM) and again in 2010 (NUMMI partnership) .

In May 2018, the United Auto Workers union filed a complaint with the National Labor Relations Board, seeking a federal investigation against Tesla for CEO Elon Musk's tweet apparently threatening worker stock options if they joined a union. Tesla responded that other car makers don't offer such stock options to union workers. Minnesota Congressman Keith Ellison chastised Musk for "threats" of unlawful retaliation and presented a list of questions on union activities and worker safety records, asking for a response by June 15.

In September 2019, a California judge ruled that 12 actions by Musk and other Tesla executives violated labor laws in 2017 and 2018 when they sabotaged employee attempts to unionize.

Securities litigation relating to production of Model 3 vehicles 
In 2017, a lawsuit alleged Tesla made materially false and misleading statements regarding its preparedness to produce Model 3 vehicles. The U.S. Department of Justice also began an investigation in 2018 into whether Tesla misled investors and misstated production figures about its Model 3 car. The lawsuit was dismissed in Tesla's favor in March 2019.

Reselling "lemon" cars 
In 2018, Tesla was accused of reselling defective "lemon" cars in the U.S.; Tesla denied the claim. On December 11, 2018, the case was ordered to arbitration. In March 2022, the case was dismissed by the court.  In Norway in 2018, Tesla buyers have gone to court with the claim that they had been sold cars with defects, and Tesla bought back the car.

Software copyright infringement 

In May 2018, it was reported that Tesla had for five or six years been using other people's copyrighted software unlawfully, specifically engaging in GPL violations. The Software Freedom Conservancy reportedly alerted Tesla to the issue repeatedly, but only in 2018 did Tesla begin to remedy its non-compliance with the software's license terms.

Martin Tripp leak and hacking 
In June 2018, Tesla employee Martin Tripp leaked information that Tesla was scrapping or reworking up to 40% of its raw materials at the Nevada Gigafactory. Tripp was fired after allegedly confessing. On June 20, 2018, Tesla filed a civil lawsuit in Nevada against Tripp, accusing him of hacking the automaker and supplying sensitive information to unnamed third parties. Tripp then filed a lawsuit against Tesla and claimed Tesla's Security team gave police a false tip that he was planning a mass shooting at the Nevada factory. By June 27, 2018, Tesla had been granted subpoenas compelling several companies that may be storing data for the former employee, including Apple, Microsoft, Google, Facebook and Dropbox to surrender any such data. Also in late June 2018, the ex-employee reacted by attempting to crowd-fund $500,000 for his legal defense and counter-suit. The court ruled in Tesla's favor on September 17, 2020.

Whistleblower allegations and retaliation 
In June 2018, former Tesla high-level safety official Carlos Ramirez sued the company for failing to treat injured workers and misclassifying worker injuries to avoid reporting them to authorities. Ramirez alleged that he was fired by Tesla in retaliation for raising concerns about these practices. In October 2018, the case was ordered to arbitration, and the case was closed in August 2021.

In August 2018, former Tesla employee Karl Hansen filed a whistleblower complaint with the SEC alleging that Tesla failed to disclose an alleged drug trafficking ring at the Nevada Gigafactory "involving the sale of significant quantities of cocaine and possibly crystal methamphetamine" for a Mexican drug cartel. Hansen also accused Tesla of spying on employees and hiding the theft of $37 million worth of copper and other raw materials. Hansen alleged that he was retaliated against and wrongfully terminated by Tesla for raising these issues internally. In 2019, Hansen filed a lawsuit related to these allegations; in 2020, the judged ordered the case to arbitration. In June 2022, the arbitrator filed an unopposed motion with the court stating Hansen "has failed to establish the claims...Accordingly his claims are denied, and he shall take nothing".

Investigation and settlement by DOJ and SEC of Musk "funding secured" tweet 
In September 2018, the U.S. Department of Justice (DOJ) began investigating Tesla based on a tweet sent out by Elon Musk. In the tweet, Musk stated that he was "considering taking Tesla private", and that he had "funding secured" to complete the deal. Musk's announcement came as a surprise to shareholders, and consequently the company's stock price rose by almost 11 percent; 17 days later, Musk said the proposal was dead.

DOJ investigators requested company documents in September related to Musk's announcement, and the company complied with the requests. The Securities and Exchange Commission (SEC) launched its own investigation into Tesla and Musk as well. The volatile stock price movement resulted in multiple shareholder lawsuits.

On October 16, 2018, the U.S. District Court for the Southern District of New York entered a final judgment approving the terms of a settlement filed with the Court on September 29, 2018, in connection with the actions taken by the SEC relating to Musk's prior statement that he was considering taking Tesla private. Without admitting or denying any of the SEC's allegations, and with no restriction on Musk's ability to serve as an officer or director on the board (other than as its chair), among other things, Tesla and Musk paid civil penalties of $20 million each and agreed that an independent director will serve as chair of the board for at least three years.

Shareholder lawsuit regarding Musk "funding secured" tweet 
Between August 10, 2018, and September 6, 2018, nine purported stockholder class actions were filed against Tesla and Elon Musk in connection with Elon Musk's August 7, 2018, Twitter post that he was considering taking Tesla private. All of the suits were consolidated into a class-action lawsuit in the United States District Court for the Northern District of California. The lawsuit asserted claims for violations of federal securities laws related to Mr. Musk's statement and seek unspecified compensatory damages and other relief on behalf of a purported class of purchasers of Tesla's securities. In February 2023, the jury found Musk and Tesla not liable.

Employee theft of Autopilot source code 
In 2019 Tesla filed a lawsuit against a named employee alleging that the employee who had worked for Tesla for two years had copied the source code of the Tesla Autopilot before joining a competing startup. In April 2021 Tesla settled the lawsuit for an undisclosed payment from the former employee.

Child labor lawsuit

Berry discrimination case 
In July 2021, former employee Melvin Berry was awarded $1 million in his discrimination case in arbitration against Tesla. Supervisors had referred to Berry using a racial slur, and retaliated against him when he complained.

Diaz discrimination case 

In October 2021 a jury verdict in the Owen Diaz vs. Tesla trial awarded the plaintiff $137 million in damages after he faced racial harassment at Tesla's Fremont facility during 2015–2016. In April 2022, federal judge William Orrick upheld the jury finding of Tesla's liability but reduced the award to $15 million. Tesla had sought to limit the amount to $600,000.

See also 
Lawsuits and controversies section on Tesla, Inc.
Criticism of Tesla, Inc.

References 

Tesla, Inc.